Reginald II may refer to:
 Reginald II, Count of Burgundy (1061–1097), Count Palatine of Burgundy and Count of Mâcon from 1087
 Reginald II, Count of Bar (died 1170), Count of Bar and Lord of Mousson from 1149
 Reginald II, Duke of Guelders (–1343), called "the Black", Count of Guelders from 1318, Duke of Guelders from 1339, and Count of Zutphen from 1326 to 1343